Paolo Giani Margi (born 11 February 1959) is an Italian equestrian. He competed at the 1992 Summer Olympics and the 1996 Summer Olympics.

References

External links
 

1959 births
Living people
Italian male equestrians
Italian dressage riders
Olympic equestrians of Italy
Equestrians at the 1992 Summer Olympics
Equestrians at the 1996 Summer Olympics
People from Gallarate
Sportspeople from the Province of Varese